Pelycidiidae is a family of sea snails, marine gastropod molluscs in the clade Sorbeoconcha.

According to the taxonomy of the Gastropoda by Bouchet & Rocroi (2005) the family Pelycidiidae has no subfamilies.

Genera
 Pelycidion P. Fischer, 1873
Genera brought into synonymy
 Nannoteretispira Habe, 1961: synonym of Pelycidion P. Fischer, 1873

References 

 Ponder W.F. & Hall S.J. (1983) Pelycidiidae, a new family of archaeogastropod molluscs. The Nautilus, 97(1): 30-35.